Worthington Hall is an Elizabethan farm house on Chorley Lane in Wigan, Manchester, England. An inscription on a lintel in the gabled porch dates the building to 1577.

The house is recorded in the National Heritage List for England as a designated Grade II* listed building, first listed on 19 November 1951.

See also
Grade II* listed buildings in Greater Manchester
Listed buildings in Worthington, Greater Manchester

References

Citations

Houses in Manchester
Grade II* listed buildings in Manchester